"One More Night" is a song written and performed by Cascada, which was first released as part of an EP in 2004 and later released as a Maxi-single in 2007 in Canada only. The 3-track e-Single features 2 remixes by Wild Ace and the original album version. The Wild Ace Club Mix is also found on a mixed-compilation CD called "HitMix 2007" sponsored by a Toronto (Canada) radio station called Z103.5 and mixed by DJ Danny D. As with most electronic music, there are many remixes. Due to the remix package leaking online, many unofficial mixes were made in addition to the official mixes.  Finally, all of the official mixes can be found on promo-series CDs worldwide.

Track listing
Official remixes
One More Night (Radio Edit) 3:43
One More Night (Dan Winter Remix) 6:05
One More Night (Club Mix) 5:36
One More Night (Wild Ace Club Mix) 7:21
One More Night (Wild Ace Radio Mix) 4:07

Unofficial remixes include, but are not limited to
One More Night (Mike Wind Vs. DJ Roxx Remix) 7:01
One More Night (DJ Money Mix) (Feat. Lil' Wayne & Drake) 4:15
One More Night (Geek Kidz Remix) 6:34
One More Night (Geek Kidz Radio Edit) 4:03
One More Night (Lockhard vs. Incoming Radio Edit) 3:35
One More Night (Hypersnap Remix) 5:35
One More Night (Lockhard vs. Incoming! Club Mix) 4:54
One More Night (Bootystylerz Remix) 4:29
One More Night (Thomas Veex Remix) 6:57
One More Night (DJ Deect Remix) 4:02
One More Night (DJ Deect Remix) 4:53
One More Night (Squadstylerz Remix) 4:27
One More Night (Flashtune Remix) 6:10
One More Night (Royal Playboys Remix) 
One More Night (Earthshakerz Remix) 5:26
One More Night (Mannton Remix) 4:07

2004 songs
Cascada songs
Songs written by Yanou
Songs written by DJ Manian